Jaunpur Junction (station code JNU), also known as Bhandariya railway station is a railway station in Jaunpur, Uttar Pradesh, India.

The station is part of the Northern Railway Lucknow Division and the Varanasi–Lucknow line via Jaunpur-Faizabad.

It is also part of the Allahabad–Jaunpur line and Aunrihar–Kerakat–Jaunpur line

Jaunpur Faizabad
Jaunpur Sultanpur
Jaunpur Pratapgarh
Jaunpur Varanasi
Jaunpur Ghazipur
Jaunpur Azamgarh  This station is an Adarsh category in Northern Railway. This station is situated in northeast Jaunpur.

Jaunpur junction is a medium-revenue station, serving over 20,000 passengers and over 60 trains on a daily basis. It is under the administrative control of the Northern Railway zone's Lucknow railway division, and partially of the North Eastern Railway zone's Varanasi railway division.

Jaunpur Junction is well connected with many important cultural cites such as Delhi, Mumbai, Kolkata and Chennai, Jammu, Chandigarh, Dehradun, Jaipur, Ahmedabad, Bhopal, Lucknow, Patna, Guwahati, Raipur, Rameswaram, Haridwar, Tiruchirappalli, Indore, Surat, Vadodara, Vapi, Nagpur, Mathura, Vijayawada, Agra, Durg etc. The station has 1 Overpass and 1 underpass facility. It also has multi facilities like unreserved class people waiting hall, SBI Bank, Public Library, Post Office, Police Station and Snack corners.

History

The Oudh and Rohilkhand Railway opened the  broad-gauge line from Varanasi to Lucknow in 1872. The line was extended to Faizabad with the Faizabad loop. Then Jaunpur Junction was built.

The Curzon Bridge across the Ganges was opened in 1905 by the East Indian Railway Company and the  broad-gauge Allahabad–Faizabad line was possibly opened the same year. It was operated by the Oudh and Rohilkhand Railway.

See also

 Varanasi Junction railway station
 Jaunpur City railway station
 Kirakat railway station
 Zafarabad Junction railway station

References

External links
 
 http://www.irfca.org/faq/faq-history2.html
 http://management.ebooks6.com/download.php?id=23852

Transport in Jaunpur, Uttar Pradesh
Lucknow NR railway division
Railway stations in Jaunpur district
Railway stations opened in 1872
Railway junction stations in Uttar Pradesh
Buildings and structures in Jaunpur, Uttar Pradesh